Bernard Malamud (April 26, 1914 – March 18, 1986) was an American novelist and short story writer. Along with Saul Bellow, Joseph Heller, and Philip Roth, he was one of the best known American Jewish authors of the 20th century. His baseball novel, The Natural, was adapted into a 1984 film starring Robert Redford. His 1966 novel The Fixer (also filmed), about antisemitism in the Russian Empire, won both the National Book Award and the Pulitzer Prize.

Biography 
Bernard Malamud was born in 1914 in Brooklyn, New York, the son of Bertha (née Fidelman) and Max Malamud, Russian Jewish immigrants. A brother, Eugene, born in 1917, suffered from mental illness, lived a hard and lonely life and died in his fifties. Malamud entered adolescence at the start of the Great Depression. From 1928 to 1932, Bernard attended Erasmus Hall High School in Brooklyn. During his youth, he saw many films and enjoyed relating their plots to his school friends. He was especially fond of Charlie Chaplin's comedies. Malamud worked for a year at $4.50 a day as a teacher-in-training, before attending college on a government loan. He received his BA degree from City College of New York in 1936. In 1942, he obtained a master's degree from Columbia University, writing a thesis on Thomas Hardy. He was excused from military service in World War II because he was the sole support of his widower father. He first worked for the Bureau of the Census in Washington D.C., then taught English in New York, mostly high school night classes for adults.

Starting in 1949, Malamud taught four sections of freshman composition each semester at Oregon State University, an experience fictionalized in his 1961 novel A New Life. Because he lacked a PhD, he was not allowed to teach literature courses, and for a number of years, his rank was that of instructor. In those days, classes in English and other liberal arts were managed by small departments. An early state policy required the university to emphasize engineering, business, and the sciences instead. While at OSU, Malamud devoted three days out of every week to his writing, and gradually emerged as a major American author. In 1961, he left OSU to teach creative writing at Bennington College, a position he held until retirement. In 1967, he was made a member of the American Academy of Arts and Sciences.

In 1942, Malamud met Ann De Chiara (November 1, 1917 – March 20, 2007), an Italian-American Roman Catholic, and a 1939 Cornell University graduate. They married on November 6, 1945, despite the opposition of their respective parents. Ann typed his manuscripts and reviewed his writing. Ann and Bernard had two children, Paul (b. 1947) and Janna (b. 1952). Janna is the author of a memoir about her father, titled My Father Is A Book.

Malamud was Jewish, an agnostic, and a humanist.

Malamud died in Manhattan on March 18, 1986, at the age of 71. He is buried in Mount Auburn Cemetery in Cambridge, Massachusetts.

In his writing, Malamud depicts an honest picture of the despair and difficulties of the immigrants to America, and their hope of reaching their dreams despite their poverty.

Writing career
Malamud wrote slowly and carefully; he was not especially prolific. He is the author of eight novels and four collections of short stories. The posthumously published Complete Stories  contains 55 short stories and is 629 pages long.  Maxim Lieber served as his literary agent in 1942 and 1945.

He completed his first novel, The Light Sleeper, in 1948, but later burned the manuscript. His first published novel was The Natural (1952), which has become one of his best remembered and most symbolic works. The story traces the life of Roy Hobbs, an unknown middle-aged baseball player who achieves legendary status with his stellar talent. This novel was made into a 1984 movie starring Robert Redford (described by the film writer David Thomson as "poor baseball and worse Malamud").

Malamud's second novel, The Assistant (1957), set in New York and drawing on Malamud's own childhood, is an account of the life of Morris Bober, a Jewish immigrant who owns a grocery store in Brooklyn. Although he is struggling financially, Bober takes in a drifter of dubious character. This novel was quickly followed by The Magic Barrel, his first published collection of short stories (1958). It won Malamud the first of two National Book Awards that he received in his lifetime.

In 1967, his novel The Fixer, about anti-semitism in the Russian Empire, won both the National Book Award for Fiction and the Pulitzer Prize for Fiction. His other novels include Dubin's Lives, a powerful evocation of middle age which uses biography to recreate the narrative richness of its protagonists' lives, and The Tenants, perhaps a meta-narrative on Malamud's own writing and creative struggles, which, set in New York City, deals with racial issues and the emergence of black/African American literature in the American 1970s landscape.

Malamud was renowned for his short stories, often oblique allegories set in a dreamlike urban ghetto of immigrant Jews. Of Malamud, Flannery O'Connor wrote: "I have discovered a short-story writer who is better than any of them, including myself." He published his first stories in 1943, "Benefit Performance" in Threshold and "The Place Is Different Now" in American Preface. In the early 1950s, his stories began appearing in Harper's Bazaar,The New Yorker,  Partisan Review, and Commentary.

Themes
Writing in the second half of the twentieth century, Malamud was well aware of the social problems of his day: rootlessness, infidelity, abuse, divorce, and more. But he also depicted love as redemptive and sacrifice as uplifting. In his writings, success often depends on cooperation between antagonists. For example, in "The Mourners" landlord and tenant learn from each other's anguish. In "The Magic Barrel", the matchmaker worries about his "fallen" daughter, while the daughter and the rabbinic student are drawn together by their need for love and salvation.

Posthumous tributes

Philip Roth: "A man of stern morality," Malamud was driven by "the need to consider long and seriously every last demand of an overtaxed, overtaxing conscience torturously exacerbated by the pathos of human need unabated."

Saul Bellow, also quoting Anthony Burgess: "Well, we were here, first-generation Americans, our language was English and a language is a spiritual mansion from which no one can evict us. Malamud in his novels and stories discovered a sort of communicative genius in the impoverished, harsh jargon of immigrant New York. He was a myth maker, a fabulist, a writer of exquisite parables. The English novelist Anthony Burgess said of him that he 'never forgets that he is an American Jew, and he is at his best when posing the situation of a Jew in urban American society.' 'A remarkably consistent writer,' he goes on, 'who has never produced a mediocre novel .... He is devoid of either conventional piety or sentimentality ... always profoundly convincing.' Let me add on my own behalf that the accent of hard-won and individual emotional truth is always heard in Malamud's words. He is a rich original of the first rank."
[Saul Bellow's eulogy to Malamud, 1986]

Centenary

There were numerous tributes and celebrations marking the centenary of Malamud's birth (April 26, 1914). To commemorate the centenary, Malamud's current publisher (who still keeps most of Malamud's work in print) published on-line (through their blog) some of the "Introductions" to these works. Oregon State University announced that they would be celebrating the 100th birthday "of one of its most-recognized faculty members" (Malamud taught there from 1949 to 1961).

Media outlets also joined in the celebration. Throughout March, April, and May 2014 there were many Malamud stories and articles on blogs, in newspapers (both print and on-line), and on the radio. Many of these outlets featured reviews of Malamud's novels and stories, editions of which have recently been issued by the Library of America. There were also many tributes and appreciations from fellow writers and surviving family members. Some of the more prominent of these kinds of tributes included those from Malamud's daughter, from Malamud's biographer Philip Davis, and from fellow novelist and short story writer Cynthia Ozick. Other prominent writers who gathered for readings and tributes included Tobias Wolff, Edward P. Jones, and Lorrie Moore.

Awards
1958 National Jewish Book Award, winner for The Assistant
1959 National Book Award for Fiction, winner for The Magic Barrel
1967 National Book Award for Fiction, winner for The Fixer
1967 Pulitzer Prize for Fiction, winner for The Fixer
1969 O. Henry Award, winner for "Man in the Drawer" in The Atlantic Monthly, April 1968
1984 PEN/Faulkner Award for Fiction, runner-up for The Stories

PEN/Malamud Award

Given annually since 1988 to honor Malamud's memory, the PEN/Malamud Award recognizes excellence in the art of the short story. The award is funded in part by Malamud's $10,000 bequest to the PEN American Center. The fund continues to grow thanks to the generosity of many members of PEN and other friends, and with the proceeds from annual readings. Past winners of the award include John Updike (1988), Saul Bellow (1989), Eudora Welty (1992), Joyce Carol Oates (1996), Alice Munro (1997), Sherman Alexie (2001), Ursula K. Le Guin (2002), and Tobias Wolff (2006).

Bibliography

Novels
 The Natural (1952)
 The Assistant (1957)
 A New Life (1961)
 The Fixer (1966)
 Pictures of Fidelman: An Exhibition (1969)
 The Tenants (1971)
 Dubin's Lives (1979)
 God's Grace (1982)

Story collections
 The Magic Barrel (1958)
 Idiots First (1963)
 Rembrandt's Hat (1974)
 The Stories of Bernard Malamud (1983)
 The People and Uncollected Stories (includes the unfinished novel The People) (1989)
 The Complete Stories (1997)

Short stories
 "The First Seven Years" (1958)
 "The Mourners" (1955)
 "The Jewbird" (1963)
 "The Prison" (1950)
 "A Summer's Reading"
 "Armistice"

Books about Malamud
Smith, Janna Malamud. My Father Is a Book: A Memoir of Bernard Malamud. (2006)
Davis, Philip. Bernard Malamud: A Writer's Life. (2007)
Swirski, Peter. "You'll Never Make a Monkey Out of Me or Altruism, Proverbial Wisdom, and Bernard Malamud's God's Grace". American Utopia and Social Engineering in Literature, Social Thought, and Political History.  New York, Routledge 2011.

References

Sources
 Contemporary Authors Online, Gale, 2004.
 Contemporary Literary Criticism
 Dictionary of Literary Biography, Volume 28: Twentieth Century American-Jewish Fiction Writers. A Bruccoli Clark Layman Book. Edited by Daniel Walden, Pennsylvania State University. The Gale Group. 1984. pp. 166–175.
 Smith, Janna Malamud. My Father Is a Book. Houghton-Mifflin Company. New York: New York. 2006
 Mark Athitakis, "The Otherworldly Malamud", Humanities, March/April 2014 | Volume 35, Number 2

External links

 The Bernard Malamud Papers at Oregon State University
 
 
 

1914 births
1986 deaths
20th-century American novelists
American agnostics
American humanists
Bennington College faculty
Burials at Mount Auburn Cemetery
City College of New York alumni
Columbia University alumni
Erasmus Hall High School alumni
Jewish agnostics
Jewish American novelists
Jews and Judaism in Oregon
National Book Award winners
O. Henry Award winners
Oregon State University faculty
Writers from Brooklyn
Writers from Manhattan
Postmodern writers
Pulitzer Prize for Fiction winners
American male novelists
Jewish American short story writers
American male short story writers
20th-century American short story writers
PEN/Faulkner Award for Fiction winners
20th-century American male writers
Novelists from New York (state)
Novelists from Oregon
Members of the American Academy of Arts and Letters